The 1985 IBF World Championships (World Badminton Championships) were held in Calgary, Canada, from June 10 to June 16, 1985. Following the results of the men's doubles.

Qualification
 Sakrapee Thongsari/Surachai Makkasasithorn -  Harald Klauer/Uwe Scherpen: 15:7, 15:9
 Benjamin Orakpo/Tamuno Gibson -  S. Afgan/A. Mugeet: w.o.
 Shinji Matsuura/Shūji Matsuno -  Nigel Tier/Andy Goode: 18:13, 15:12
 Billy Gilliland/Dan Travers -  S. Gondwe/A. Mutale: w.o.
 Leory D'Sa/Sanat Misra - : w.o.

Main stage

Section 1

Section 2

Final stage

References

1985 IBF World Championships